Mina J. Bissell is an Iranian-American biologist known for her research on breast cancer. In particular, she has studied the effects of a cell's microenvironment, including its extracellular matrix, on tissue function.

Early life and education
Bissell was born in Tehran, Iran and brought up in an educated and wealthy family. By the time she graduated from high school, Bissell was the top graduate in her year in Iran. A family friend, through the American Friends of Iran, encouraged Bissell to come to the United States. She enrolled at Bryn Mawr, then transferred to Radcliffe College where she earned a bachelor's degree in chemistry. She obtained a PhD in bacteriology from Harvard Medical School (1969) and was awarded an American Cancer Society postdoctoral fellowship at the University of California, Berkeley.

Career 
She joined the Lawrence Berkeley Laboratory as a staff biochemist in 1972 and subsequently became a Senior Scientist, Director of Cell & Molecular Biology, Director of the Life Sciences Division, and Distinguished Scientist. In 1996, she received the Ernest Orlando Lawrence Award and medal, the highest scientific honor bestowed by the United States Department of Energy. A member of the American Academy of Arts and Sciences, the Institute of Medicine, and the American Philosophical Society, Bissell is a recipient of the Guggenheim Fellowship, the Mellon Award from the University of Pittsburgh, the Eli Lilly/Clowes Award of the American Association for Cancer Research, and the Medal of Honor from the American Cancer Society. She was elected to the National Academy of Sciences in 2010, one of the highest honors bestowed on working scientists. In 2016, the American Society for Cell Biology will bestow the E.B. Wilson Medal, its highest scientific honor, to Dr. Bissell for her work showing that physical context matters in cells and her demonstrations that the extracellular matrix (ECM) is integral to breast tissue remodeling and to breast cancer progression. In 2020 she received the Canada Gairdner International Award.

She is the former head of life sciences at Lawrence Berkeley Laboratory. Her work started over 30 years ago on the effect of tissue architecture and the role of the cellular microenvironment on cancer still has become increasingly influential in the field of cancer biology and cancer therapeutics. She is credited with the radical but increasingly accepted notion that phenotype can dominate over genotype in normal development and disease.

Bissell and her colleague, William Ole Peterson, have developed 3D culture in cancer research. They have shown non-tumorgenic (normal-like) mammary epithelial cells form monolayer spherical acini with hollow lumen and tumorgenic mammary epithelial cells form filled bowl irregular acini (Petersen OW, et al. PNAS 89(19):9064-9068). She has published about 300 articles and book chapters.

In June 2012 she presented at the TED conference. On Cancer Day 2013, this talk was featured as the first talk in a series of ten talks about cancer presented by TED.

References

External links 
 Testing the Boundaries: an interview with Mina J. Bissell
 Some (slightly old) biographical information
 New York Times article on Mina Bissell
 

Iranian biochemists
21st-century American biologists
Year of birth missing (living people)
Living people
Iranian women scientists
Iranian expatriate academics
21st-century Iranian inventors
Iranian emigrants to the United States
Lawrence Berkeley National Laboratory people
American women biologists
People from Tehran
Radcliffe College alumni
Harvard Medical School alumni
Iranian biologists
American women biochemists
Cell biologists
21st-century American women scientists
Bryn Mawr College alumni
Women inventors
Members of the National Academy of Medicine